The Huntington Center is an 8,000-seat multi-purpose arena in downtown Toledo, Ohio. It was completed in 2009 and cost $105 million to build.  It replaced the Toledo Sports Arena, which has since been demolished.

It serves as the home of the Toledo Walleye ECHL ice hockey team, and was the home of the Toledo Crush of the Legends Football League for the 2014 season.

History
After a successful partnership on the Mud Hens Stadium (Fifth Third Field), the Lucas County Commissioners teamed with HNTB Architecture Inc., a national sports architecture firm located in Kansas City; The Collaborative Inc., of Toledo; and Poggemeyer Design Group, of Toledo, for a new arena.

The arena was designed as the first new LEED sports arena in the United States.  The arena's signature green design element is a  "green wall" outside of the building, to feature the use of plant life on the exterior of the building to help cool the arena by shading the glass-enclosed main entrance of the arena.  The arena's location near mass transit systems, use of a light-colored roof membrane to reflect heat and sunlight, and underground cisterns collecting rain water to re-use for landscaping purposes around the arena, are also emphasized to earn LEED points for the project.

The Huntington Center opened in 2009.

Notable events

The arena is part of a complex that includes SeaGate Convention Centre and Fifth Third Field. The first person to perform at this venue was Jeff Dunham.

Other performances that have happened at the Huntington Center include: Janet Jackson, Daughtry, Tool, Lil' Wayne, Rascal Flatts, Carrie Underwood, Elton John, Brad Paisley, Stevie Nicks, Kid Rock, Jason Aldean, Hunter Hayes, Bob Seger, Trans-Siberian Orchestra, and TobyMac. It is also the Toledo-area stop for World Wrestling Entertainment.

Huntington Bancshares Incorporated bought the naming rights to Lucas County Arena in April 2010 and renamed it as the Huntington Center.  The six-year, $2.1 million naming rights and sponsorship agreement includes three renewal options of six years each, and could mean total Huntington payments of $11 million. The proceeds are to be applied to paying down the arena's $90 million debt.

The Huntington Center hosted the 2019 CCM/ECHL All Star Classic on January 21, 2019.

References

External links
Huntington Center official site 
Lucas County Arena Renderings

Indoor ice hockey venues in the United States
Sports venues in Toledo, Ohio
Toledo Walleye
Tourist attractions in Toledo, Ohio
Sports venues completed in 2009
2009 establishments in Ohio
Basketball venues in Ohio
Indoor arenas in Ohio